The NBL1 East, formerly the Waratah League, is a semi-professional basketball league in New South Wales and the Australian Capital Territory, comprising both a men's and women's competition. In 2021, Basketball New South Wales and the National Basketball League (NBL) announced a partnership to bring NBL1 to New South Wales in 2022, with NBL1 replacing the Waratah League. As a result, the Waratah League became the east conference of NBL1. The Waratah League was previously a member of the Australian Basketball Association (ABA) from 2001 to 2008.

Current clubs

* Teams that transferred from the Waratah League.
** Teams that transferred from other NBL1 conference.

List of Champions
Premier Division

Waratah League

Source: Waratah League History

Notes

References

External links

Waratah League official website
Basketball New South Wales official website

NBL1
 
2
Basketball in the Australian Capital Territory
Basketball in New South Wales
Sports leagues established in 1991
1991 establishments in Australia